Kalinauskas  is a common Lithuanian surname, equivalent to Polish Kalinowski. Its feminine forms are: Kalinauskienė (married woman or widow) and Kalinauskaitė (unmarried woman).

It may refer to:
 Juozas Kalinauskas (b. 1935), Lithuanian sculptor and medalist
 Kostas Kalinauskas (1838–1864), writer, journalist, lawyer and revolutionary
 Rapolas Kalinauskas (1835–1907), Polish Discalced Carmelite friar inside the Russian partition of Polish-Lithuanian Commonwealth, in the city of Vilnius.
 Vytautas Kalinauskas (1929–2001), Lithuanian graphic artist, painter and stage designer
 Rolandas Kalinauskas, Lithuanian pilot and ultralight aircraft designer (Rolandas Kalinauskas RK-5 Ruth, RK-6 Magic, RK-7 Orange)
 Igor Kalinauskas (b. 1945), Russian artist, theater director, musician, member of the vocal duo Duo Zikr
 Virginija Kalinauskaitė (b. 1957), Lithuanian graphic artist

Lithuanian-language surnames